Cat & Calmell are an Australian pop duo band from Sydney, Australia.

Cat & Calmell released their debut single "Dumbshit" in October 2020.

Career
Cat & Calmell released "Get Old" in June 2021. The single was their fourth from their debut EP, Life of Mine. The duo said the EP "encapsulates a time in our lives that was full of a lot of excitement, but also a lot of uncertainty. It's such a time-stamp of our slightly younger and slightly more reckless days. A lot of the songs on this EP were written awhile back, so it's nice to see where we were and where we came from both in terms of our music and our headspace back then."

Members
 Catherine Stratton
 Calmell Teagle

Discography

Extended plays

Singles

Awards and nominations

APRA Awards
The APRA Awards are held in Australia and New Zealand by the Australasian Performing Right Association to recognise songwriting skills, sales and airplay performance by its members annually.

! 
|-
| 2022
| "Dramatic"
| Most Performed Pop Work
| 
| 
|-

Rolling Stone Australia Awards
The Rolling Stone Australia Awards are awarded annually in January or February by the Australian edition of Rolling Stone magazine for outstanding contributions to popular culture in the previous year.

! 
|-
| 2022
| Cat & Calmell
| Best New Artist
| 
| 
|-

References

2020 establishments in Australia
Musical groups established in 2020